Eballistra oryzae is a plant pathogen of rice also known as leaf smut.

Resistant hosts 
Some rice cultivars are resistant against leaf smut.

References

External links 
 Index Fungorum
 USDA ARS Fungal Database

Fungal plant pathogens and diseases
Ustilaginomycotina
Fungi described in 1914
Taxa named by Hans Sydow
Taxa named by Paul Sydow